Rachael Ann Carpani (born 24 August 1980) is an Australian actress best known as Jodi Fountain in McLeod's Daughters.

Biography
Carpani grew up on a property near Dural, in Sydney's Hills District.  Carpani has twice been nominated at the Logies, both in 2007.

Career
She is most famous for her role as Jodi Fountain on the Australian TV drama McLeod's Daughters. Carpani also had a role in the film Hating Alison Ashley, starring Delta Goodrem, and appeared in All Saints. Carpani attended The Hills Grammar School with Delta Goodrem.

Carpani left McLeod's Daughters to pursue her career in the United States. She had been cast in the CBS pilot, Law Dogs with Janeane Garofalo, but the series was not picked up. She appeared in seven episodes of season one of Cane. Rachael then returned to McLeod's Daughters as Jodi Fountain for the final episode on 31 January 2009.

Carpani appeared commercially as one of the faces for Telstra's Next G network. She appeared in episode six of NCIS: Los Angeles in November 2009, playing a small role alongside Chris O'Donnell and LL Cool J. In 2010, she had a recurring role on The Glades, playing opposite former real-life boyfriend Matt Passmore, with whom she split in 2011. She began starring in the crime drama Against the Wall in 2011. In 2015, Carpani starred in the TV films If There Be Thorns and Seeds of Yesterday on the Lifetime cable network, which are the third and fourth films in the Flowers in the Attic TV film series that are based on the Dollanganger novel series by V.C. Andrews. In 2018, she appeared in a multi-episode arc in the Seven/South Pacific series 800 Words.

Filmography

Awards
Carpani has been nominated for several television awards in her career. For her role on McLeod's Daughters, she has been nominated for the following awards at the Logies:
 Gold Logie (in 2007)
 Logie Award for Most Popular Actress (in 2007)

References

External links
 
 "Carpani Chases U.S. Fame" article in The Age

Australian film actresses
Australian stage actresses
Australian soap opera actresses
1980 births
Living people
Actresses from Sydney
Australian people of Italian descent
Macquarie University alumni
People educated at The Hills Grammar School